
Lake Paranoá (Portuguese: Lago Paranoá) is an artificial lake in Brasília, the capital of Brazil. During construction of the city, the Paranoá River was dammed to form the lake. On its shores are embassies and consulates, sports clubs, restaurants, the residential areas of Lago Sul and Lago Norte, the University of Brasília, the Olympic Center, and the Palácio da Alvorada, the official residence of the 
President of Brazil.

See also
Altineu Pires, prepared Lake Paranoá charts for Brazilian Navy

References

Lakes of Brazil
Landforms of Federal District (Brazil)
Artificial lakes